The Bung language is a nearly extinct, endangered language of Cameroon spoken by three people (in 1995) at the village of Boung on the Adamawa Plateau. It is remembered best by one speaker who learned the language at a young age, though it is not his mother tongue. A wordlist shows its strongest resemblance to be with the Ndung dialect of Mambiloid language Kwanja, although that may simply be because this has become the dominant language of the village where Bung's last speakers reside. It also has words in common with other Mambiloid languages such as Tep, Somyev and Vute, while a number of words' origins remain unclear (possibly Adamawan). For lack of data, it is not definitively classified.

References

External links
 The Endangered Languages Project: Bung

Niger–Congo languages
Languages of Cameroon
Unclassified languages of Africa
Endangered Niger–Congo languages
Endangered unclassified languages